Aníbal Machado (born 9 December 1894, Sabará–died , Rio de Janeiro) was a Brazilian writer born in Sabará, Minas Gerais. He had been the president of the Brazilian Association of Writers and received numerous awards for his novels. He was also honored by the Academia Brasileira de Letras. He is the father of playwright Maria Clara Machado. Machado was also a pro-football player for Clube Atlético Mineiro and scored the very first goal for the team in 1909.

External links

1894 births
1964 deaths
People from Sabará
20th-century Brazilian novelists
20th-century Brazilian male writers
Brazilian male novelists